Manlio Cristin (18 January 1936 - 1997) was an Italian hammer thrower.

Cristin, Sardinian, but Ligurian by adoption, has set the national record of the hammer throw in 1961, a record that lasted for six years.

National records
 Hammer throw: 61,96 m (Palermo, 7 October 1961) - record holder until 6 May 1967.

Achievements

National titles
Cristin won three national championships at individual senior level.

Italian Athletics Championships
Hammer throw: 1959, 1961, 1964 (3)

References

External links
 Almanacco del lancio del martello 

1936 births
1997 deaths
Place of death missing
Italian male hammer throwers
Sportspeople from Sardinia
Sportspeople from Liguria